Number 7028 Cadbury Castle was a Great Western Railway 4073 Castle class 4-6-0 steam locomotive built at the former GWR Swindon Works on 19 May 1950. The Castle Class locomotives were built as express passenger locomotives on the GWR. The Castle Class locomotives were to replace the earlier 4000 Star class locomotives. They were designed by the railway's Chief Mechanical Engineer, Charles Collett. Cadbury Castle cost £10,546 and an extra £1,094 for her Hawksworth tender.

7028's working life 
Cadbury Castle was based at Landore, Swansea for 11 years. She worked normal passenger express trains around GWR's network. On 31 October 1961 she was moved to Llanelli and fitted with a double chimney and a 4 row superheater. She worked at Llanelli for a further two years before being withdrawn on 28 December 1963. On 19 March 1964, she was scrapped by Balborough Metals Ltd, Briton Ferry, Swansea. It is worth noting that although Cadbury Castle was of GWR design, she only served with BR, as she was built 2 years after the railways were nationalised.

The Western Pullman 
Cadbury Castle formed part of a Hornby model railways train set, The Western Pullman. In this set Cadbury Castle was featured with four Pullman carriages and part of Hornby's Track Pack system. This set has ceased production now and has been replaced by Whittington Castle in the new DCC set.

References 
 http://www.greatwestern.org.uk/m_in_cas_castle7.htm
 http://www.invaluable.com/auction-lot/railwayana-a-gwr-brass-cabside-numberlat-1-c-gd0etzk6ev

7028
Railway locomotives introduced in 1950
Individual locomotives of Great Britain
Standard gauge steam locomotives of Great Britain
Scrapped locomotives